Repatriation General Hospital is or was part of the name of a number of Australian hospitals:

Repatriation General Hospital, Concord (1947–1993), in the Sydney suburb of Concord, now Concord Repatriation General Hospital
Repatriation General Hospital, Daw Park (1941–1995), in the Adelaide suburb of Daw Park (which has retained its name)
Repatriation General Hospital, Greenslopes (1947–1995), in the Brisbane suburb of Greenslopes, now Greenslopes Private Hospital
Repatriation General Hospital, Heidelberg (founded 1941), in the Melbourne suburb of Heidelberg, now Austin Hospital, Melbourne
Repatriation General Hospital, Hobart (1921–1992), became part of Royal Hobart Hospital in 1992
Repatriation General Hospital, Hollywood (1941–1994), in the Perth suburb of Nedlands, now Hollywood Private Hospital
  Repatriation General Hospital, Keswick (1919–1946), in the Adelaide suburb of Keswick

See also
 Lady Davidson Hospital, Turramurra, New South Wales (founded 1 January 1915)
 McLeod Repatriation Hospital (founded 1920)
 Repatriation Hospital, Kenmore, Queensland (1945–1994)
 [Repatriation] Outpatient Clinic, Keswick, South Australia (1946–1968)
 Repatriation Hospital 'Birralee', Belair, South Australia (1952–1976)